Black coal equivalent (BCE) is an export coal product derived from the Coldry Process, a patented coal upgrading technology operated by Environmental Clean Technologies Limited, in Victoria, Australia. The Coldry Process is applied to brown coal (lignite) with a typical moisture content of 60 per cent by weight and transforms the coal into a densified coal product of equal or better calorific value (5,800 kcal/kg) to typical export quality black coal, with less ash and sulfur content. Black coal equivalent derived from  brown coal is ostensibly a 'cleaner' burning coal fuel than most black coals.

Overview
Densified coal as a black coal equivalent product derived from brown coal was first discovered by R. B. Johns and colleagues at the Organic Chemistry laboratory at Melbourne University following observations made at the Maddingley Mine near Bacchus Marsh, Victoria. Johns and colleagues identified that a process of low-mechanical shear applied to brown coal mixed with a small amount of moisture would trigger a natural exothermic reaction process within the coal, leading to the expulsion of its moisture content. The process fundamentally alters micro chemical bonds within the coal, naturally reducing moisture content to around 11 per cent; boosting calorific value to around 5800 kcal/kg; and creating a ‘densified coal’ product that is hydrophobic, no longer prone to spontaneous combustion, and readily transportable.

Characteristics
The performance characteristics of black coal equivalent densified coal derived from brown coal is benchmarked against the comparative burning properties of black coal mined and exported from mining regions in Tarong, Queensland and Newcastle, New South Wales, Australia. Black coal sourced from Tarong and Newcastle constitute the bulk of black coal currently exported by Australia. Black coal equivalent has become an attractive option to coal importers from countries with no or few reserves of domestic black coal.

Chemical composition

Comparison of calorific values

adb = as dry basis. ar = as received. db = dry basis. wb = wet basis.

See also

 Bituminous coal
 Bergius process
 Coal assay
 Coldry Process
 Energy value of coal
 Orders of magnitude (specific energy density)
 Fischer–Tropsch process
 Karrick process
 Leonardite
 Maddingley Mine
 List of CO2 emitted per million Joule of energy from various fuels

References

External links
Environmental Clean Technologies website
 Coldry:Lignite Dewatering Process

Coal